Martin Hoop (born Carl Martin Hoop; 14 April 1892, in Lägerdorf, District of Steinburg, Schleswig-Holstein – 11 May 1933, in Zwickau) was a district leader in the Communist Party of Germany in Saxony and a supporter of the Weimar Republic presidential candidate Ernst Thälmann.

Life
Hoop was born in Lägerdorf northwest of Hamburg.  His father was the cottager and painter Johann Martin Hoop (1864–1939). His mother was Catharine Wilhelmine Augusta née Paulsen (1863–1962). Martin was the second oldest of six brothers and a sister - Heinrich, Johannes, Wilhelm, Helene, Max (died in infancy), Walter, Bernhard. After elementary school, Martin Hoop undertook an apprenticeship as electrician in Hamburg. During his apprenticeship, he joined a trade union and became a member of a workers' singing group. After his apprenticeship, he traveled. During World War I he served in heavy artillery, then trained as radio operator and served on the Western Front.

At the end of the war Hoop went to Bautzen where on 28 December 1918 he married Anna Elizabeth Frieda Holtsch.  In Bautzen he and his wife joined the Independent Social Democratic Party of Germany (USPD). After establishment of the Communist Party of Germany (KPD), he became a member of the local Bautzen chapter, in which he served as chairman, as well as member of the KPD of the District of Bautzen. In 1924 he was elected to the Bautzen Town Council, as well as became chairman of the Red Front Fighter Federation in Bautzen. At the end of 1926 he was appointed Secretary of the KPD in east Saxony and moved to Dresden, where he and his wife resided in the Dresden city-district Plauen at Hegerstrasse 10.

The marriage with Frieda remained childless. After divorce (27 March 1931), Hoop became Secretary of the KPD in the district of Zwickau. In this capacity he was active in organizing protests and demonstrations in opposition to the impending seizure of power by the National Socialist German Workers Party, as well as preparing for undercover work for the KPD. In early 1933, under the pseudonym 'Peter', Hoop conducted undercover work in Chemnitz.

Arrest and death

Circumstances of the arrest of Martin Hoop indicate that no legal proceedings took place against him and/or that no warrant for his arrest was issued. Very probably the secret state police (Gestapo) or storm troopers (Sturmabteilung) took him into custody because of his political activity. In East German law records, there are two cases in the year 1933 concerning crimes in the concentration camp Schloss Osterstein in Zwickau, in which Hoop is mentioned. The first case record contains the following entry (cf link under ref 7 for dates of cases):

A second case concerning espionage for the Nazi regime contains the following entry.

Evidently the accused (Z) betrayed Martin Hoop. On 2 May 1933 (cf also Gleichschaltung), Hoop was arrested in the café restaurant of the department store "Tietz" in Chemnitz and transported to Schloss Osterstein in Zwickau, which at the time served as concentration camp. After 1945, a public trial was conducted against former guards of the Zwickau prison. In the trial proceedings, details of mistreatment of prisoners are reported in depth, including the following testimony that refers to the death of Martin Hoop during the night of 10–11 May 1933.

Martin Hoop's body was never found.

In a letter dated 27 December 1949 to the Bautzen office of the Union of Persecutees of the Nazi Regime (VVN), a Bautzner neighbor of the former wife of Martin Hoop wrote the following:

Relevance
In the contemporary history of the German communist party (KPD) in Saxony, the Bautzen City Councillor Martin Hoop was known as an ardent supporter of the Weimar Republic presidential candidate Ernst Thälmann. It was, for example, only the Bautzen district leadership who was opposed to the expulsion from the Party of Ruth Fischer and Arkadi Maslow, two of Thälmanns political predecessors, Hoop was one of the few KPD functionaries opposed to the theory of “relative stabilization” and of its implications in the Weimar Republic (see also, 1925 German presidential election), called for a return to agreements made at the 10 July 1925 KPD congress (only weeks before the intervention of the Communist International), and brought attention to the failure of united front politics in Saxony.

In autumn of 1923 an extensive weapons cache was discovered in the Bautzen machine factory Münckner & Co., where Hoop had once been employed. In a joint action, a group of communist and social-democratic workers secured the weapons, which led to a court action against several individuals, among them Hoop, as well as the social-democratic labor union secretary Konrad Arndt and communist workers such as Kurt Pchalek. Accused of actions conducive to high treason, Pchalek was sentenced to 15 months prison. Other defendants, including Hoop and Arndt, were acquitted.

On 2 May 1924 the Reichstag Representative Siegfried Rädel spoke at a public meeting of the KPD in Bautzen. On the same occasion, Martin Hoop also spoke about the May Day workers’ demonstration, characterizing the treatment by the Bautzen police as 'disgraceful and brutal'. On 5 September Rädel spoke on the subject of the Dawes Plan and “How Are Reparations To Be Paid.”

Among other activities during his service as Bautzen City Councilman, Hoop led a demonstration against the Tscheka trial taking place in Leipzig in early 1925. “Judging from its appearance, the entire procession resembled a carnival parade, rather than a protest demonstration."  Siegfried Rädel observed, '…although the intellectual spiritus rector is Hoop, ...he has as good as no support behind him.' 

Weakness in the east Saxon KPD leadership made possible more effective control of local party affairs through national parliamentary representatives like Siegfried Rädel, who, together with the left majority, supported the politics of Ernst Thälmann. The east Saxon leadership was however unaware of the Thälmann-Stalin correspondence and sent to the KPD a resolution of endorsement. Martin Hoop was one of the eight endorsers.

In the Saxon KPD, the question was: how to introduce united front policies ‘from below.’  One form of this tactic, endorsed by Siegfried Rädel, with support from the KPD central committee, was a letter campaign to individual SPD workers and to factory workers’ assemblies. Martin Hoop was of the opinion that no contact be made with local SPD representatives.

Discouraged by political developments, Martin Hoop began to consider a 'new life' in the 'new world'. However, he remained in Saxony as an active organizer in the revolutionary Zwickau workers' movement. At the end of World War II, the trade union of coal miners “Morgenstern” resumed its activities as a state-owned enterprise which operated until 1977 under the name Martin Hoop Pits.

Literature

Brief biographies in:
 Hermann Weber: Die Wandlung des deutschen Kommunismus. Die Stalinisierung der KPD in der Weimarer Republik (The transformation of German communism. The Stalinization of the KPD in the Weimar Republic). Volume 2. Frankfurt/Main 1969, p. 169
 Hermann Weber, Andreas Herbst: Deutsche Kommunisten: Biographisches Handbuch (German communists: Biographic manual), 1918-1945. Berlin: Karl Dietz publishing house, 2004, p. 328.

Notes and references

1892 births
1933 deaths
People from Steinburg
People from the Province of Schleswig-Holstein
Independent Social Democratic Party politicians
Communist Party of Germany politicians
Rotfrontkämpferbund members
Politicians who died in Nazi concentration camps
German Army personnel of World War I
People from Schleswig-Holstein executed in Nazi concentration camps